Marco Murriero  (born 20 January 1983) is an Italian football goalkeeper who last played for Martina.

Murriero was signed by Udinese in January 2006. He also played for Bellinzona from Italian speaking region at Swiss Challenge League. In summer 2007, Murriero joined Martina in co-ownership deal.

After Martina was not admitted to Lega Pro Seconda Divisione 2008–09, Murriero became free agent.

External links

Italian footballers
Italian expatriate footballers
AC Bellinzona players
Udinese Calcio players
Association football goalkeepers
Expatriate footballers in Switzerland
Italian expatriate sportspeople in Switzerland
Footballers from Milan
1983 births
Living people
A.S.D. Martina Calcio 1947 players